Kënga Magjike 2017 was the 19th edition of the annual Albanian music competition Kënga Magjike. It was organised by Televizioni Klan (TV Klan) and consisted of two semi-finals held on 6 and 7 December and the final on 9 December 2017 at the Pallati i Kongreseve in Tirana. The three live shows were hosted by Ardit Gjebrea, Ariola Shehu and Nevina Shtylla. Anxhela Peristeri with "E Çmëndur" emerged as the winner of the contest.

Format 

The 2017 edition of Kënga Magjike was organised by Televizioni Klan (TV Klan) and also the 19th consecutive edition of the contest. The former consisted of two semi-finals on 6 and 7 December, and the final on 9 December 2017. The three live shows were hosted by Ardit Gjebrea and Albanian presenter Ariola Shehu and Albanian model Nevina Shtylla.

Semi-finals

Semi-final 1 

The first semi-final took place on 6 December 2017.

Semi-final 2 

The second semi-final took place on 7 December 2017.

Final 
 
The grand final took place on the 9th of December 2017. Before the end of the show, Anxhela Peristeri with "E Çmëndur" emerged as the winner of the contest.

Key:
 Winner
 Second place
 Third place

References 

2017
2017 in Albanian music
2017 song contests
December 2017 events in Europe